Ak-Yeniköy is a small town in the District of Didim, Aydın Province, Turkey. As of 2010, it had a population of 2391 people.

References

Villages in Didim District